Zavety Ilyicha is a rural locality (a settlement) and the administrative center of Zavetilyichyovsky Selsoviet, Aleysky District, Altai Krai, Russia. The population was 600 in 2013. There are 11 streets.

Geography 
Aleysk is the nearest rural locality.

References 

Rural localities in Aleysky District